Ruhi Chaturvedi Saainiyol (born 27 April 1993) is an Indian model and actress best known for playing the Sherlyn Khurana in Ekta Kapoor's Kundali Bhagya.

Career
Ruhi was a finalist of Miss India Worldwide 2010. She has modelled for Lakme Fashion Week, India Fashion Week, Rocky Star, JJ Valaya, Vikram Phadnis, Ritu Kumar and Ritu Beri.

Chaturvedi made her debut with a 2012 musical thriller film Aalaap.

In 2017, she came into limelight when she was seen as antagonist Sherlyn Khurana in Zee TV's Kundali Bhagya. In March 2023, she quit the series owing to a generation leap as she wanted to explore more as an actress.

Since December 2022, she is seen in Star Bharat's Aashao Ka Savera... Dheere Dheere Se.

Personal life
Ruhi Chaturvedi was born in Jaipur, Rajasthan. She did her schooling from Divine Child School, Mumbai. She then completed her majors in History by joining Bhavan's College.

On 2 December 2019, Chaturvedi married her long-time boyfriend Shivendraa Saainiyol in a private ceremony attended by her family members, relatives and close friends.

Filmography

Films

Television

References

External links

Living people
Indian television actresses
Actresses from Rajasthan
Actresses in Hindi television
1993 births
Actresses from Mumbai
Indian soap opera actresses
21st-century Indian actresses